Aleksey or Alexei Pavlov may refer to:

 Alexei Pavlov (swimmer) (born 1974), athlete from Kyrgyzstan
 Alexei Petrovich Pavlov (18541929), Russian geologist and paleontologist
 Aleksey Pavlov (lieutenant) ru (19131949), Hero of the Soviet Union
 Aleksey Pavlov (pilot) ru (19221995), Hero of the Soviet Union